Saint Jerome in Meditation is an oil painting on panel by Piero di Cosimo, dating to  and now in the Museo Horne in Florence.

External links
http://www.polomuseale.firenze.it/catalogo/scheda.asp?nctn=00287560&value=1

Paintings by Piero di Cosimo
Paintings in the collection of the Museo Horne
Cosimo
1490s paintings
Books in art
Skulls in art